Senator Lester may refer to:

Albert Lester (died 1867), New York State Senate
Rufus E. Lester (1837–1906), Georgia State Senate